The Chinese Community Bulletin Board (also known as the Chinatown Community Bulletin Board) is installed on the eastern exterior of the Louisa Hotel in Seattle's Chinatown―International District, in the U.S. state of Washington. Located at 511 Seventh Ave. S, the board was installed in the 1960s and designated a Seattle Historic Landmark in 1976. KING-TV has called the fixture "Seattle's original social media board". King County has included the board as a point of interest in a walking tour of the district.

See also 

 List of Seattle landmarks

References

External links 
 

1960s establishments in Washington (state)
Chinatown–International District, Seattle
Chinese-American culture in Washington (state)